Carex nebrascensis is a species of sedge known as Nebraska sedge.

Distribution
This sedge is native to the central and Western United States and north into central Canada. It grows in wetlands at various elevations, including the Sierra Nevada and Mojave Desert sky islands. Carex nebrascensis tolerates alkaline soils and submersion for long periods of time.

Description
Carex nebrascensis produces upright, angled, spongy stems up to about 90 centimeters tall. The waxy, bluish leaves form tufts around the base of each stem. The root system is a very dense network of rhizomes. The inflorescence includes a few narrow staminate spikes above some wider pistillate spikes on short peduncles. The fruit is covered in a tough, slightly inflated sac called a perigynium which sometimes has a pattern of red spotting.

Uses
Uses for this sedge, Carex nebrascensis, include: 
Forage for livestock and wildlife
Ornamental grass ("grasslike") plant in natural, native plant, and habitat gardens
Erosion control and soil compaction remediation.
Restoration ecology
Riparian zone restoration 
Stream restoration
Wetland restoration   
Phytoremediation in natural and constructed wetlands for wastewater treatment by bioremediation.

References

External links
Jepson Manual Treatment - Carex nebrascensis
Carex nebrascensis - Photo gallery at Calphotos

nebrascensis
Flora of the Western United States
Flora of the United States
Flora of Nebraska
Flora of the California desert regions
Flora of the Sierra Nevada (United States)
Flora of Canada
Garden plants of North America
Halophytes
Phytoremediation plants
Plants described in 1854
Flora without expected TNC conservation status